The Ajman Real Estate Regulatory Agency (ARRA, ARERA or Ajman RERA) is an Ajman, United Arab Emirates based government regulatory authority responsible for the regulation and licensing of Ajman's real estate market, consumer protection and dispute resolution. However ARRA does not resolve disputes concerning rent of property units.

Jurisdiction and legal powers
All land, villas and apartments, freehold or otherwise within Ajman, must be solely registered with ARRA. Noncompliance may result in the developer being fined 100,000 AED (27,233.12 USD) onwards. ARRA is also responsible for certifying escrow bank accounts.

See also
Real Estate Regulatory Agency

References

External links
 

Organizations with year of establishment missing
Real estate industry trade groups
Government agencies of the Emirate of Ajman
Economy of the Emirate of Ajman